Brian Stemmle (born October 12, 1966) is a Canadian retired skier who competed primarily in the downhill and Super-G disciplines. Stemmle was a member of the Canadian Alpine Ski Team for 14 years and was inducted into the Canadian Ski Hall of Fame in 2002. He appeared at four Winter Olympic Games from 1988 through 1998.

Olympics
Stemmle represented Canada at four Winter Olympic Games.  At the 1988 Winter Olympics in Calgary, Stemmle competed in the downhill event, but missed a gate on his run and was disqualified.  At the 1992 Games in Albertville, Stemmle finished 23rd in the downhill competition.  Competing in the Super-G event at the 1994 Olympics, Stemmle finished 26th.  Stemmle's fourth time at the Olympics was at the 1998 Games in Nagano, competing in both the Super-G and downhill.  He finished twelfth in the Super-G and did not finish in the downhill event, as he caught a rut low on the course, after being ahead of the eventual winner at the previous split by about half a second.

History 
Born in Aurora, Ontario, Stemmle was a member of the National Team from 1985 to 1999, and represented Canada at the 1988, 1992, 1994 and 1998 Olympic Winter Games.

During his 15 years of international competition, Stemmle competed in 93 FIS Alpine Ski World Cup races, garnering three podium finishes and placing in the top ten on 15 separate occasions.  His best international result occurred in 1996 when he captured a silver medal during a World Cup event in Garmisch, Germany.

Known primarily as a downhill specialist, Stemmle also experienced great success in the super-G discipline, capturing a bronze medal during a 1985 World Cup event in Furano, Japan.

A six-time medalist at the Canadian Championships, Stemmle currently works as a television colour commentator for Rogers Sportsnet. He worked for CBC during the Olympics in 2006 and was the lead commentator for Alpine Skiing at the 2010 Winter Olympics in Vancouver/Whistler.

Kitzbuhel 

Stemmle suffered a major setback during a 1989 competition in Kitzbuhel, Austria after a crash nearly ended not only his career, but his life.  He fought back from a broken pelvis, massive internal injuries and infection by winning a gold medal at the 1990 Winter Pan American Games in Las Leñas, Argentina.  Stemmle returned to the World Cup circuit for the next nine seasons until his retirement in 1999.

References

External links
 
 

1966 births
Living people
Canadian male alpine skiers
Olympic alpine skiers of Canada
Alpine skiers at the 1988 Winter Olympics
Alpine skiers at the 1992 Winter Olympics
Alpine skiers at the 1998 Winter Olympics
Alpine skiers at the 1994 Winter Olympics
Sportspeople from Aurora, Ontario
Skiing people from Ontario